Yasmin Abshir Warsame (born May 5, 1976) is a Somali-Canadian model and activist. In 2004, she was named "The Most Alluring Canadian" in a poll by Fashion magazine.

Biography
Warsame was born in Mogadishu, Somalia in 1976. She is a Muslim. When she was fifteen years old, she moved from Somalia to Toronto, Ontario, Canada with her family.

In 2000, Warsame began modeling again with Ford Models in Toronto, with a booking for the Sears catalogue. In the summer of 2002, after switching to NEXT Models Canada,  she was featured as the cover model of Lush Magazine, photographed by fashion photographer Koby Inc, she headed for Paris. In December 2011 she was featured as the cover model of YYZ Living then later an entire 2012 editorial from Flare.

Career
Warsame has worked for agencies like SHOK Models (discovered Yasmin), NEXT Toronto/Montreal (mother agency), NEXT Paris, NEXT London, IMG New York, View Barcelona and Tony Jones Amsterdam. She has been featured on the covers of a.o. Vogue Italia and American Vogue, American and British Elle, and Amica and Surface magazines. She has also modelled both the couture and ready-to-wear runways for everyone from Christian Dior to Jean Paul Gaultier. In addition, Warsame has done high-profile advertising campaigns for Valentino couture, Dolce & Gabbana, Escada, Hermès, Shiseido, Chanel, GAP and H&M.

In 2007, she also became a judge on Cycle 2 of the Canadian reality television series Canada's Next Top Model.

She had her first acting role in Khadar Ayderus Ahmed's 2021 film The Gravedigger's Wife.

Personal life
Warsame currently lives in New York City and Toronto, and is signed with IMG Models.

Notes

References
 Eckenswiller, Tammy. The most alluring Canadian Award 2004. Fashion Magazine. Retrieved 12 May 2006.

External links

1976 births
Living people
Ethnic Somali people
Canadian expatriates in the United States
Female models from Ontario
Canadian Muslims
IMG Models models
People from Mogadishu
People from New York City
People from Toronto
Somalian emigrants to Canada
Somalian expatriates in the United States
Somalian female models
Somalian actresses
Canadian film actresses
Black Canadian actresses